The Rookie is an American police procedural television series created for ABC by Alexi Hawley. The series follows John Nolan, a man in his forties, who becomes the oldest rookie at the Los Angeles Police Department. The series is produced by ABC Studios and Entertainment One; it is based on real-life Los Angeles Police Department officer William Norcross, who moved to Los Angeles in 2015 and joined the department in his mid-40s. In May 2021, the series was renewed for a fourth season which premiered on September 26, 2021. On March 30, 2022, ABC renewed the series for a fifth season which premiered on September 25, 2022.

Series overview

Episodes

Season 1 (2018–19)

Season 2 (2019–20)

Season 3 (2021)

Season 4 (2021–22)

Season 5 (2022–23)

Ratings

Season 1

Season 2

Season 3

Season 4

Season 5

References

External links
 
 

Rookie